Pontibacter indicus  is a bacterium from the genus of Pontibacter which has been isolated from soil which was contaminated with hexachlorocyclohexane in Lucknow in India.

References 

Cytophagia
Bacteria described in 2014